The electoral district of Broadmeadows is an electorate of the Victorian Legislative Assembly. It also includes parts of Glenroy, Roxburgh Park, Somerton and Westmeadows. It lies within the Northern Metropolitan Region of the upper house, the Legislative Council.

The seat was created in 1955, and though it was initially won by Liberal and Country member Harry Kane, has been a safe Labor seat for most of its history. Kane held the seat until his death in 1962, and was succeeded by Labor backbenchers John Wilton (1962–1985) and Jack Culpin (1985–1988).

In 1988 Culpin, a former member for abolished Glenroy, lost Labor preselection for Broadmeadows for that year's election to Jim Kennan, member of the Legislative Council and then Minister for Transport, who was attempting to switch to the Legislative Assembly. Culpin resigned from the Labor Party and contested Broadmeadows as an independent, but was defeated by Kennan at the election. Kennan served as Deputy Premier under Joan Kirner from 1990 to 1992, and succeeded Kirner as Leader of the Opposition from March to June 1993.

Kennan resigned as Opposition Leader and from parliament in June 1993, and was succeeded in Broadmeadows at the resulting by-election by John Brumby, a member of the Legislative Council and former federal MP, who like Kennan sought to switch to the Legislative Assembly. Brumby later served as Opposition Leader from 1993 to 1999, and Premier of Victoria from 2007 to 2010. He resigned from parliament in 2011, and was succeeded as member for Broadmeadows at the resulting by-election by Frank McGuire, journalist, business consultant and brother of broadcaster Eddie McGuire.

Members for Broadmeadows

Election results

External links
 Electorate profile: Broadmeadows District, Victorian Electoral Commission

References

Electoral districts of Victoria (Australia)
1955 establishments in Australia
Broadmeadows, Victoria
City of Hume
City of Merri-bek
Electoral districts and divisions of Greater Melbourne